Tiffany Calver (born 16 September 1994) is a British radio DJ and presenter.

Early life 
Calver was born and bred in Telford, but moved to London at the age of 17 in order to attend college and be closer to the music scene in the city. Calver studied Media at the City of Westminster College. While studying, Calver blogged for MTV and SB.TV. She subsequently interned at a management company, which gave her access to numerous events. It was at this time that Calver began DJing.

Career 
Calver previously worked at Kiss FM. She started at BBC Radio 1Xtra in January 2019, replacing Charlie Sloth. Her Rap Show on 1Xtra was awarded "Best Radio Show" by British magazine DJMag.

References

External links
1Xtra's Rap Show with Tiffany Calver (BBC Radio 1 & BBC Radio 1Xtra)

BBC Radio 1Xtra presenters
BBC Radio 1 presenters
Women DJs
Living people
1994 births